Craniella is a genus of marine sponges in the family Tetillidae.

Species 
The following species are recognised in the genus Craniella:

 Craniella abracadabra de Laubenfels, 1954
 Craniella arb (de Laubenfels, 1930)
 Craniella atropurpurea (Carter, 1870)
 Craniella australis Samaai & Gibbons, 2005
 Craniella azorica (Topsent, 1913)
 Craniella baeri Van Soest & Hooper, 2020
 Craniella carteri Sollas, 1886
 Craniella coxi (Lendenfeld, 1886)
 Craniella craniana de Laubenfels, 1953
 Craniella cranium (Müller, 1776)
 Craniella crustocorticata Van Soest, 2017
 Craniella curviclada Fernandez, Rodriguez, Santos, Pinheiro & Muricy, 2018
 Craniella disigma Topsent, 1904
 Craniella elegans Dendy, 1905
 Craniella globosa Thiele, 1898
 Craniella hamatum (Koltun, 1966)
 Craniella insidiosa Schmidt, 1870
 Craniella lens Schmidt, 1870
 Craniella lentiformis Thiele, 1898
 Craniella lentisimilis Tanita & Hoshino, 1989
 Craniella longipilis (Topsent, 1904)
 Craniella metaclada (Lendenfeld, 1907)
 Craniella monodi (Burton, 1929)
 Craniella neocaledoniae Lévi & Lévi, 1983
 Craniella ovata Thiele, 1898
 Craniella oxeata (Burton, 1959)
 Craniella polyura (Schmidt, 1870)
 Craniella prosperiaradix Tanita & Hoshino, 1989
 Craniella schmidtii Sollas, 1886
 Craniella sigmoancoratum (Koltun, 1966)
 Craniella simillima (Bowerbank, 1873)
 Craniella spinosa Lambe, 1893
 Craniella sputnika Lehnert & Stone, 2011
 Craniella stewarti (Lendenfeld, 1888)
 Craniella tethyoides Schmidt, 1870
 Craniella varians Thiele, 1898
 Craniella vestita (Lendenfeld, 1907)
 Craniella villosa Lambe, 1893
 Craniella wolfi Schuster, 2018
 Craniella zetlandica (Carter, 1872)

References

External links 

 
 
 Craniella at the World Register of Marine Species (WoRMS)

Spirophorida
Sponge genera